Threat Signal is a Canadian heavy metal band from Hamilton, Ontario. The band has had numerous lineup changes, with only Jon Howard remaining from the original incarnation. Their music is often classified as metalcore, melodic death metal, groove metal, industrial metal, and hard rock.

Biography

Early years (2003–2005) 
Threat Signal was formed in the summer of 2003 by cousins Jon and Rich Howard. Shortly after, they recruited local guitarist Kyle McKnight and began writing and recording music and posted their demo for the song "Rational Eyes" on an international metal chart on GarageBand.com. After a few weeks, the song reached No. 1 and had received GarageBand awards for best guitars, best drums, best male vocals, best production, song of the week, and song of the day. This success sparked record label interest and helped create a following even before the band had ever played live.

In the spring of 2004, drummer Adam Matthews joined, as did bassist Eric Papky (who was Kyle Mcknight's former guitar teacher). On December 10, 2004, Threat Signal headlined their first show at The Underground in Hamilton. For the better part of 2005, Threat Signal would continue to write and record material for a full-length album. In the summer of 2005, Eric Papky left the band and was replaced by Marco Bressette.

Under Reprisal (2005–2008) 
In September 2005, the band traveled to Los Angeles to record their debut album Under Reprisal with producer Christian Olde Wolbers of Fear Factory. During the recording process, drummer Adam Matthews left the band; he would be replaced by George Parfitt. In November, the band signed a recording deal with the label Nuclear Blast.

Under Reprisal was released on May 6, 2006, to excellent reviews. In July 2006, Threat Signal took part in Germany's Earthshaker Festival. A month later, guitarist Rich Howard left the band and was replaced by the band's bassist, Marco Bressette; the new bassist position went to Pat Kavanagh.

In October 2006, the band went on the six-week American "Last Stab Tour" with Soilwork, Mnemic, and Darkest Hour. In November, Under Reprisal won Canadian Recording of the Year award at the Hamilton Music Awards.

In March 2007, Threat Signal began demoing new material, but was hampered by the departure of  guitarist Marco Bressette. Former member Rich Howard filled in until the position was filled by Adam Weber.

Threat Signal was tapped as the opener for the Tour and Loathing Canadian trek alongside Protest the Hero, All That Remains, Blessthefall, and The Holly Springs Disaster. But, in July, the band announced that there would be no further touring that summer. This was because both Kyle McKnight and George Parfitt had left the band; they were eventually replaced by Travis Montgomery on guitar and Norman Killeen on drums. In the interim, McKnight's departure resulted in the cancellation of 60 shows.

In 2008, Howard and Kavanagh joined ex-Fear Factory members Raymond Herrera and Christian Olde Wolbers in the side-project band Arkaea.

Vigilance (2009–2010) 
Threat Signal's second album Vigilance, which was produced by Jon Howard (who is now the only founding member left in the band) and mixed by Greg Reely, was released on September 8, 2009, in North America and September 11, 2009, in Europe. Reviews were good. The band produced a music video for the track "Severed" and, on July 15, released a 32-minute "Making Of" video for the new record, containing footage of the recordings, the song-writing process and interviews with band members. The album sold around 1,100 copies in its first week of sale in the United States, with the band touring alongside Epica and later Dark Tranquillity to support the album.

In July 2010, Adam Weber quit the band. Ex-Darkest Hour guitarist Kris Norris stepped in. Two months later, drummer Norman Killeen left; Adam and Norman were eventually replaced by drummer Alex Rüdinger and guitarist Chris Feener.

Threat Signal (2011–2016) 
Threat Signal's self-titled album was released on October 7, 2011, in Europe and on October 11, 2011, in North America. It was produced by Chris "Zeuss" Harris (Chimaira, Hatebreed, The Acacia Strain etc.), and received rave reviews.  To promote the album, the band toured the US and Eastern Canada in 2012 with Children of Bodom, Eluveitie, and Revocation.

In April 2012, Alex Rüdinger left the band; Chris Feener left shortly afterwards. He was replaced by Matt Perrin. Rüdinger was eventually replaced by former Our Lady of Bloodshed drummer Joey Muha, who left in June 2015 to join Jungle Rot.  Andrew Minarik stepped in for Disconnect.

Disconnect (2017–present) 
Through this, the band was touring and working on its fourth album, Disconnect, which was released on November 10, 2017, by Agonia Records. Reviews were mixed. The band continued to tour North America in support of the album.

While Threat Signal continued to perform, in January 2019, Jon Howard also joined the new metal band Imonolith.

Members 

Current
 Jon Howard – vocals (2003–present)
 Travis Montgomery – lead guitar (2007–present)
 Ryan Miller – bass (2018–present)
 Joey Muha – drums (2013–2015, 2018, 2020–present)
 Oswin Wong – rhythm guitar (2018, 2020–present)

Former
 Kyle McKnight – lead guitar (2003–2007)
 Rich Howard – rhythm guitar, backing vocals (2003–2006)
 Adam Matthews – drums (2004–2005)
 Eric Papky – bass (2004–2005)
 Marco Bressette – bass (2005–2006), rhythm guitar (2006–2007)
 Pat Kavanagh – bass, backing vocals (2006–2018)
 George Parfitt – drums (2006–2007)
 Norman Killeen – drums (2007–2010; died 2016)
 Adam Weber – rhythm guitar (2007–2010)
 Alex Rüdinger – drums (2010–2012)
 Kris Norris – rhythm guitar (2010, 2013)
 Chris Feener – rhythm guitar (2010–2012)
 Matt Perrin – rhythm guitar (2013–2020)

Studio musicians
Andrew Minarik – drums (2015–2016) for Disconnect

Touring musicians
 Christian Olde Wolbers – bass (2016)
 James Knoerl – drums (2016)

Timeline

Discography

Studio albums 
 Under Reprisal (Nuclear Blast, 2006)
 Vigilance (Nuclear Blast, 2009)
 Threat Signal (Nuclear Blast, 2011)
 Disconnect (Agonia, 2017)

Singles 
 "Rational Eyes" (Nuclear Blast, 2006)
 "A New Beginning" (Nuclear Blast, 2008)
 "Through My Eyes" (Nuclear Blast, 2009)
 "Comatose" (Nuclear Blast, 2011)
 "Fallen Disciples" (Nuclear Blast, 2011)
 "Face the Day" (Nuclear Blast, 2011)
 "Uncensored" (Nuclear Blast, 2012)
 "Exit the Matrix" (Agonia, 2017)
 "Elimination Process" (Agonia, 2017)

References

External links 
 Facebook page
 [ AllMusic.com: Biography]
 Threat Signal at Encyclopaedia Metallum: The Metal Archives

2003 establishments in Ontario
Canadian heavy metal musical groups
Canadian melodic death metal musical groups
Canadian metalcore musical groups
Groove metal musical groups
Industrial metal musical groups
Musical groups established in 2003
Musical groups from Hamilton, Ontario
Musical quintets
Nuclear Blast artists